Sebastián Salinas Gaete is a Chilean historian and a sports commentator, who is known for publishing a book on the history of Colo-Colo. 

He has taught courses at the University of Chile Center for Byzantine and Neohellenic Studies and at the Center for Arab Studies of the same university.

Works
 Por empuje y coraje: Los albos en la época amateur 1925−1933 (2004)

See also
 University of Chile Center for Byzantine and Neohellenic Studies

References

External links
 University of Chile Profile
 Profile at University of Chile Center for Arab studies

Living people
Chilean people
Chilean historians
University of Chile alumni
Year of birth missing (living people)